UDGB may refer to:
 Double-stranded uracil-DNA glycosylase, an enzyme
 Uracil-DNA glycosylase, an enzyme